Joe McHugh (born 16 July 1971) is an Irish Fine Gael politician who has served as Chair of the Committee on European Union Affairs since September 2020. He has been a Teachta Dála (TD) for the Donegal constituency since 2016, and previously from 2007 to 2016 for the Donegal North-East constituency. He served as Minister for Education and Skills from 2018 to 2020 and as a Minister of State from 2014 to 2018, including as Government Chief Whip from 2017 to 2018. He was a Senator for the Administrative Panel from 2002 and 2007.

In May 2022, McHugh announced that he would not stand at the next general election.

Early life
Born in Carrigart, County Donegal, in 1971. McHugh was educated at Umlagh National School and the Loreto Convent, Milford. He attended the National University of Ireland, Maynooth, where he received an honours degree in economics and sociology, and a higher diploma in education. McHugh taught geography and mathematics at the Loreto Convent Secondary School, Letterkenny, from 1993 to 1995. From 1995 to 1996, he taught A-level economics in Dubai. In 1996, he returned to Ireland and became a youth worker in the Ballyboe area of Letterkenny.

Political career

Donegal County Council
McHugh won a seat in the Milford local electoral area in the 1999 Donegal County Council election.

Seanad Éireann
He was elected to Seanad Éireann as a Senator for the Administrative Panel in 2002, where he served as Fine Gael Spokesperson on Community, Rural, Gaeltacht and Marine Affairs. McHugh set up a full-time constituency office in Letterkenny. When he was selected as the Dáil candidate for Donegal North-East, he moved into a new constituency office, which was officially opened by Fine Gael party leader Enda Kenny on 6 October 2006.

Dáil Éireann
McHugh topped the poll Donegal North-East at the 2007 general election with 22.6% of the first preference vote. His wife Olwyn Enright also won re-election to the Dáil, making them the third married couple to sit in the same Dáil. McHugh was appointed party deputy Spokesperson for Foreign Affairs and the Department of the Taoiseach, with special responsibility for North-South Co-operation in October 2007. McHugh was re-elected to the Dáil at the 2011 general election, attaining 19.3% of the first-preference vote.

In January 2011, McHugh called for a monument, funded by the government, in Donegal, dedicated to the founding of the Ulster Volunteer Force in 1912. McHugh was criticised by Eileen Doherty, a sister of Donegal County Councillor and Provisional IRA member Eddie Fullerton, who was assassinated by loyalists in 1991. Doherty claimed McHugh and other Fine Gael councillors in Donegal had snubbed a number of commemorative events and opposed the building of a monument in Fullerton's memory in Buncrana. Fullerton was the third elected official in the Republic of Ireland to be assassinated.

In Manchester in October 2011, McHugh became the first Fine Gael TD to address delegates from the British Conservative Party. He described it as an "opportunity."

On 15 July 2014, he was appointed as Minister of State at the Department of Communications, Energy and Natural Resources and at the Department of Arts, Heritage and the Gaeltacht with responsibility for Gaeltacht Affairs and Natural Resources. His appointment was met with criticism as his knowledge of the Irish language was at a basic level, although he subsequently received praise for his efforts to improve his language skills to the point where he could conduct lengthy interviews in the language. RTÉ Radio 1 produced the radio documentary Fine Gaeilgeoir, narrated and produced by Máire Treasa Ní Cheallaigh, following McHugh's efforts to improve his Irish over the course of a year. Shane Ross later wrote of his fear of having what he described as a "Joe McHugh moment", meaning being a non-Irish speaker to a Gaeltacht ministry.

In February 2016, McHugh was heavily criticised for allocating 93% of Gaeltacht grants to the Donegal Gaeltacht, which is located in and beside his constituency. This revelation led to calls for McHugh to appear before the Dáil Public Accounts Committee to explain such a disproportionate allocation of funding. McHugh subsequently denied the claims.

At the 2016 general election, McHugh was elected to the new five-seater Donegal constituency on the 11th count. The following May, he met Charles, Prince of Wales, and Camilla, Duchess of Cornwall, during their day visit to the county.

He was appointed as Minister for Education and Skills on 16 October 2018. He was not re-appointed to the Government of the 33rd Dáil in June 2020, and declined the offer of appointment as a Minister of State. In September 2020, McHugh became Chair of the Committee on European Union Affairs.

In May 2022, McHugh announced that he would not stand at the next general election. On 6 July 2022, McHugh resigned the Fine Gael party whip in order to vote for an opposition bill regarding the Mica scandal.

Personal life
In July 2005, McHugh married Olwyn Enright, who served as a Fine Gael TD for Laois–Offaly from 2002 to 2011. They have three children.

See also
Families in the Oireachtas

References

External links

Joe McHugh's page on the Fine Gael website

 

1971 births
Living people
Alumni of Maynooth University
Fine Gael TDs
Fine Gael senators
Irish schoolteachers
Local councillors in County Donegal
Members of the 22nd Seanad
Members of the 30th Dáil
Members of the 31st Dáil
Members of the 32nd Dáil
Members of the 33rd Dáil
Ministers of State of the 31st Dáil
Ministers of State of the 32nd Dáil
Politicians from County Donegal
Spouses of Irish politicians
Donegal Gaelic footballers
Ministers for Education (Ireland)
Government Chief Whip (Ireland)